Sundays and Cybèle is a 1962 French film in Franscope, directed by Serge Bourguignon. Its original French title is Les dimanches de Ville d'Avray (Sundays in Ville d'Avray), referring to the Ville-d'Avray suburb of Paris. The film tells the tragic story of a young girl who is befriended by an innocent but emotionally disabled veteran of the French Indochina War.

Plot 
Pierre suffers from amnesia after a war-time accident in which he might have killed a young Vietnamese girl while crash-landing his stricken plane. His nurse, Madeleine, lives with him in a low-key but potentially romantic relationship. When Pierre sees Cybèle, a young girl in distress as her obviously loveless father is dropping her off at an orphanage, he befriends her.  Each of the two is lonely, childlike, and in need of a supportive friend. Eventually, he pretends to be the girl's father, which allows her to escape the locked orphanage for a day, and he shares every one of his Sundays with her for months.

Pierre conceals his friendship with Cybèle from Madeleine, but she eventually finds out, and tells Bernard, a doctor who has a romantic interest in her. Bernard assumes the girl to be in danger, and notifies the police, who adopt the same assumption.

Pierre has nothing to give Cybèle for Christmas, so he accepts her facetious challenge to bring her the metal rooster from the top of a Gothic church near the orphanage. While Cybèle falls asleep, awaiting Pierre for their Christmas together in the snow-covered park's gazebo, the former pilot musters the nerve to climb the 300-foot steeple. With his knife as a tool to unscrew the rooster, he brings it down.  As he returns to Cybèle, with the metal rooster and his knife in his hands, the police arrive and shoot him dead to "protect" the child, whom they imagine to be in danger. Cybèle awakens to the horror of seeing that her friend is dead and cries in anguish.

Cast
Hardy Krüger as Pierre
Nicole Courcel as Madeleine
Patricia Gozzi as Cybèle/Françoise
Daniel Ivernel as Carlos
André Oumansky as Bernard

Awards
Sundays and Cybele won the 1962 Academy Award for Best Foreign Language Film. The nominations for writing and scoring were for the 1963 Academy Awards the following year.

See also
 List of submissions to the 35th Academy Awards for Best Foreign Language Film
 List of French submissions for the Academy Award for Best Foreign Language Film

References

External links
 
 
Sundays and Cybèle: Innocent Love? an essay by Ginette Vincendeau at the Criterion Collection

1962 films
Best Foreign Language Film Academy Award winners
1960s French-language films
French black-and-white films
Films about orphans
Films directed by Serge Bourguignon
Films scored by Maurice Jarre